"Best in Me" is a song by English boy band Blue. It was released exclusively in New Zealand in August 2002 as the fifth and final single from their debut studio album, All Rise (2001). The song peaked at number 10 on New Zealand's RIANZ Singles Chart.

Music video
The music video was directed by Si & Ad.

Charts

References

 

 
2001 songs
2002 singles
Blue (English band) songs
Innocent Records singles
Songs written by Bill Padley
Songs written by Jem Godfrey
Virgin Records singles